Railway stations in Kazakhstan include:

Maps 
 UN Map
 reliefweb map

Towns 
(Stations should be in line order)

Existing 
 Ganyushkino - near Russian border
 Atyrau
 Beyneu
 Aqtau - port on Caspian Sea
 Aqtober - near Russian border
 Embi
 Shalqar
 Baikonur - spaceport
 Qyzylorda
 Tashkent, Uzbekistan
 Shymkent
 Zhambyl
 Dostyk-Alashankou on China border; break-of-gauge
 Kokshetau - Kokshetau-1 railway station, Kokshetau-2 railway station
 Almaty - Almaty-1 railway station, Almaty-2 railway station
 Shu - junction
 Beskol
 Saryshagan
 Balqash
 Sayak
 Qaraghandy
 Nur-Sultan - Astana railway station
 Aktogay - Aktogay railway station

 (Second through route opened 2012) 
 Zhetigen, Kazakhstan
 Altynkol railway station
  gauge
 Korgas Transfer Hub on border with China; break-of-gauge
  gauge
 Jinghe, China - junction

Under construction 

 Uzen
 Gyzylgaya, Turkmenistan
 Bereket
 Etrek
 Gorgan, Iran

 proposed standard gauge line across Kazakhstan to China will be announced later in 2010 under auspicies of ECO.

See also 

 Transport in Kazakhstan
 Break-of-gauge
 Tengri Unitrade CARGO

References

External links

Railway stations
Kazakhstan
Kazakhstan
Railway stations